The 47th Directors Guild of America Awards, honoring the outstanding directorial achievements in films, documentary and television in 1994, were presented on March 11, 1995 at the Beverly Hilton. The ceremony was hosted by Carl Reiner. The nominations were announced on January 23, 1995.

Winners and nominees

Film

Television

Commercials

D.W. Griffith Award
 James Ivory

Lifetime Achievement in Sports Direction
 Bud Greenspan

Robert B. Aldrich Service Award
 Max A. Schindler

Franklin J. Schaffner Achievement Award
 Larry Carl

Honorary Life Member
 Sheldon Leonard

References

External links
 

1994 film awards 
1994 television awards
Directors Guild of America Awards
Direct
Direct
Directors
1995 in Los Angeles
March 1995 events in the United States